Samuele Burgo (born 20 March 1998) is an Italian canoeist. He competed in the men's K-1 1000 metres event at the 2020 Summer Olympics.

References

External links
 

1998 births
Living people
Italian male canoeists
Olympic canoeists of Italy
Canoeists at the 2020 Summer Olympics
People from Syracuse, Sicily
ICF Canoe Sprint World Championships medalists in kayak
European Games competitors for Italy
Canoeists at the 2019 European Games
21st-century Italian people